Euphaedra neumanni is a butterfly in the family Nymphalidae. It is found in south-western Ethiopia and southern Sudan.
It is a member of the Euphaedra preussi species group q.v.

References

Butterflies described in 1902
neumanni